Terry Sims (born ) is an American football coach. He served as the head football coach at Bethune–Cookman University from 2015 to 2022. Sims was fired following the 2022 season.

Head coaching record

References

External links
 Bethune–Cookman profile
 

Year of birth missing (living people)
1970s births
Living people
American football defensive backs
Austin Peay Governors football coaches
Bethune–Cookman Wildcats football coaches
Howard Bison football coaches
Knoxville Bulldogs baseball players
Knoxville Bulldogs football players
Louisiana Ragin' Cajuns football coaches
Louisville Cardinals football coaches
Prairie View A&M Panthers football coaches
Texas Southern Tigers football coaches
University of Louisville alumni
People from Jesup, Georgia
Coaches of American football from Georgia (U.S. state)
Players of American football from Georgia (U.S. state)
Baseball players from Georgia (U.S. state)
African-American coaches of American football
African-American players of American football
African-American baseball players
20th-century African-American sportspeople
21st-century African-American sportspeople